Robert Morss Lovett (December 25, 1870 – February 8, 1956) was an American academic, writer, editor, political activist, and government official.

Background

Lovett was born in Boston, Massachusetts, and graduated from Harvard University in 1892. While a student at Harvard, he joined Delta Upsilon fraternity.

Career
After a period teaching at Harvard, Lovett came to Chicago in 1893 to teach writing and English literature at the University of Chicago.  He was assistant professor of English (1894–1904); associate professor from 1904 to 1909; and full professor from 1909 onward.  From 1903 to 1920 he was dean in the junior college. He was a member of the National Institute of Arts and Letters.  Professor Lovett was the author of The History of English Literature, with W. V. Moody (1902); Richard Gresham, a novel (1904); The First View of English Literature, with W. V. Moody (1905); A Winged Victory, a novel (1907); and Cowards, a play (1914).  He served as editor of the Dial in 1917 and joined the editorial staff of The New Republic in 1921.  He assisted Tarak Nath Das.

Lovett was associate editor of The New Republic magazine in 1921-40, and a signer, in 1933, of the first manifesto of what has since become the Humanist Manifesto series, since superseded in 2003 by the third, Humanism and Its Aspirations.

As Government Secretary of the Virgin Islands in 1939-43, Lovett served as acting Governor from December 14, 1940 until February 3, 1941.

In 1943, the Dies Committee charged him as a communist subversive, over his association with left-wing individuals and groups; through an enactment passed by both houses of Congress, he was forced out of the Secretary position and barred from federal employment.  Lovett, who denied he was a Communist, challenged this action through the courts as an unconstitutional bill of attainder, and though he did not get the job back, he won a 1946 decision from the Supreme Court (United States v. Lovett), and received back pay.

Personal life and death
Lovett spent many years living at Hull House, where his wife was aide to Jane Addams.  He died in St. Joseph's Hospital in Chicago in 1956.

References

 Review of Liberal to a Fault., by Robert Morss Lovett. Time (Jun. 21, 1948).
 "Robert M. Lovett, Educator, Is Dead" (obituary). New York Times (Feb. 9, 1956), p. 31.

External links
 
Robert Morss Lovett papers (University of Chicago Library)
United States v. Lovett, 1946 U.S. Supreme Court ruling
Robert Morss Lovett materials in the South Asian American Digital Archive (SAADA)

1870 births
1956 deaths
Harvard University alumni
Harvard University faculty
University of Chicago faculty
Governors of the United States Virgin Islands
20th-century American novelists
American male novelists
Writers from Boston
Writers from Chicago
20th-century American dramatists and playwrights
American male dramatists and playwrights
20th-century American male writers
Novelists from Illinois
Novelists from Massachusetts